Made Up Mind is the second studio album from blues-rock group Tedeschi Trucks Band. It was released August 20, 2013 by Masterworks Records.

In 2014, it won a Blues Music Award in the 'Rock Blues Album of the Year' category.

Reception
Thom Jurek of AllMusic wrote " Made Up Mind is tight; it maintains the gritty, steamy, Southern heart displayed on Revelator, but the growth in songwriting, arrangement, and production is immeasurable. Everything these players have assimilated throughout their individual careers is filtered through a group consciousness. When it expresses itself musically, historical and cultural lineages are questioned and answered incessantly in the tension of their dialogue, creating a sound that is not only instantly recognizable, but offers a nearly limitless set of sonic possibilities." Julian Ring of Rolling Stone called the album "equal parts Stax and Muscle Shoals without the dilution of either." PopMatters called the album "a brilliant throwback without ever truly sounding anachronistic."

The album debuted at No. 11 on Billboard chart in its first week, and it also debuted at No. 9 on the album sales chart, as well as No. 2 on Billboard’s Rock chart and No. 1 on the Blues chart. The album has sold 113,000 copies in the United States as of December 2015.

Track listing

Personnel
 Derek Trucks – lead guitar
 Susan Tedeschi – lead vocals, rhythm guitar
 Bakithi Kumalo – bass guitar, conga, percussion
 Dave Monsey – bass guitar
 Pino Palladino – bass guitar
 George Reiff – bass guitar
 Kofi Burbridge  – clavinet, Flute, Hammond B3, piano, Wurlitzer
 Tyler Greenwell – drums, percussion
 J. J. Johnson – drums, percussion
 Mike Mattison – harmony vocals
 Mark Rivers – harmony vocals
 Kebbi Williams – saxophone
 Maurice "Mobetta" Brown – trumpet
 Saunders Sermons – trombone
 Doyle Bramhall II – guitar, background vocals
 John Leventhal – guitar

Chart positions

References

External links 

Tedeschi Trucks Band albums
2013 albums
Albums produced by Jim Scott (producer)